Pittsburg Landing is a river landing on the west bank of the Tennessee River in Hardin County, Tennessee. It was named for "Pitts" Tucker who operated a tavern at the site in the years preceding the Civil War. The landing helped connect the west side of the river to a road on the east that went back to Savannah. The landing was home to many families of settlers that migrated from about 1840 to 1860. The aforementioned tavern was on the site that is now Shiloh National Military Park Visitor Center and Shiloh National Military Park/Pittsburgh Landing Graveyard.

The Battle of Pittsburg Landing, also known as the Battle of Shiloh, was fought here on April 6–7, 1862. It had great significance as the first major battle of the Civil War in the west, marking the end of Confederate dominance in Tennessee, and it is commemorated in Shiloh National Military Park.

References

External links

Unincorporated communities in Tennessee
Unincorporated communities in Hardin County, Tennessee
Battlefields of the Western Theater of the American Civil War